Mirko Stojanović (born 11 June 1939 in Zagreb) is a Croatian retired footballer. In his career, he made four international appearances for the Yugoslav national team.

Playing career

Club
While playing for NK Dinamo Zagreb he won the 1959–60 Yugoslav Cup. In 1963–64 while at Red Star Belgrade he won both the Yugoslav First League title and his second Yugoslav Cup. After moving to the United States he won the titles with Oakland in 1967, Dallas in 1971 and an indoor title with San Jose in 1975.

International
Stojanović made his debut for Yugoslavia in a November 1961 friendly match away against Japan, coming on as a 46th-minute substitute for Milutin Šoškić, and earned a total of 4 caps, scoring no goals. He was an unused substitute for Yugoslavia at the 1962 FIFA World Cup, in which they placed fourth. His final international was a May 1964 friendly away against Czechoslovakia.

Managerial career
He was the original coach of the Oakland Stompers before being fired after only eight games and a record of four wins and four losses. He stayed on as the team's director of player personnel

Honors
NK Dinamo Zagreb
1959–60 Yugoslav Cup
Red Star Belgrade
1963–64 Yugoslav First League
1963–64 Yugoslav Cup
Oakland Clippers
1967 NPSL Champion
Dallas Tornado
1971 NASL Champion
San Jose Earthquakes
1975 NASL Indoor Champion

References

External links
 
 Profile at Serbian federation official site
 NASL stats

1939 births
Living people
Footballers from Zagreb
Association football goalkeepers
Yugoslav footballers
Yugoslavia international footballers
1962 FIFA World Cup players
GNK Dinamo Zagreb players
Red Star Belgrade footballers
Oakland Clippers players
Dallas Tornado players
NK Olimpija Ljubljana (1945–2005) players
San Jose Earthquakes (1974–1988) players
Yugoslav First League players
National Professional Soccer League (1967) players
North American Soccer League (1968–1984) players
North American Soccer League (1968–1984) indoor players
Yugoslav expatriate footballers
Expatriate soccer players in the United States
Yugoslav expatriate sportspeople in the United States
Yugoslav football managers
North American Soccer League (1968–1984) coaches